Francisco Paula Gonzales (1936 – 7 May 1964) was a Filipino sailor and mass murderer. 

He competed in the Dragon event together with Fausto Preysler and Jesus Villareal at the 1960 Summer Olympics. After the Olympics he moved to San Francisco, United States. 

At some point, his wife requested a divorce and he fell into debt. He flew to Reno, Nevada on 6 May 1964. The next day Gonzales was on his return flight: Pacific Air Lines Flight 773. He shot and killed both pilots, and then himself. The Fairchild F-27 crashed, killing all 44 people on board. Investigation showed Gonzales had taken out a $100,000 life insurance policy for his wife.

References

External links
 

1936 births
1964 suicides
Filipino male sailors (sport)
Olympic sailors of the Philippines
Sailors at the 1960 Summer Olympics – Dragon
Sportspeople from Manila
Murder–suicides in California
Filipino mass murderers
Hijackers
Suicides by firearm in California
20th-century American criminals
American mass murderers